Boğaziçi University Sports Fest is Turkey's biggest student-organized sports festival, held in Boğaziçi University facilities every year since 1980 with the original name, ''Spor Bayramı''. This festival includes contribution of the both school and students of Boğaziçi University, and participation of hundreds of sportsmen around the world.

Sports Committee 

Sports Committee's history lies its roots back to "The Athletics Association" founded in 1896 at Robert College. This organisation was also the first student association to be established in Turkey. Sports Committee's aim, as one of the main parts of social life in Boğaziçi University, is to create a sportive environment with our numerous organization. For the past 120 years, the Sports Committee has been arranging all the sports events in the university. Binding 800 sportsmen in 23 different branches of sports under its root, this association has also various organizations which are Boğaziçi University Sports Awards, SnowBreak, Field Day, Fall Games, Interfaculty Tournament, Water Sports Weekend and Sports Fest.

Boğaziçi University 
Formerly known as Robert College, the history of the university dates back to 1863, as the first American institution of higher education established outside the USA. Situated on a hill-top overlooking the  Bosphorus, the university enjoys a reputation of being one of the most distinguished higher education establishment in Turkey and the Middle East. The University is a member of a network of universities across Europe and the USA with which there is a dynamic student exchange program.

Participant List 
 Albania: University of Tirana
 Armenia: Gyumri State Pedagogical Institute, State Engineering University
 Austria: Business University of Vienna, Graz University (Karl-Franzens-Universität), University of Innsbruck, University of Economics and Business
 Belgium: Artesis Hogeschool Antwerpen, Ghent University
 Bosnia: Sarajevo University
 Bulgaria: Academy of Economics, College of Economics and Management, Engineering and Geodesy, European Polytechnical University, Konstantin Preslavsky University of Shumen, National Sports Academy, Plovdiv Agricultural University, Sofia University St ''KLIMENT OHRIDSKI'', Technical University of Sofia, University of Architectura, University of Rousse, University of Shumen, University of Sofia, University of Civil Agriculture, Ufiiski University, Varna Medical University
 Canada: University of Toronto
 Croatia: Faculty of Economics and Business, University of Economics and Business, University of Pula, University of Zagreb, Vern University of Applied Sciences, Zagreb School of Economics and Management
 Cyprus: East Mediterranean University, Girne American University
 Czech Republic: Czech Technical University
 Denmark: Roskilde University
 Estonia: Tallinn Pedagogical University
 Finland: Helsinki School of Economics
 France: Cergy-Pontoise University, Lille University, Essec Graduates, Essec University, Oleons College, Paris Dauphiné University, Science PO Paris, St. Etienne School of Management, Université du Littoral, University of St. Denis, University of Paris 8
 Georgia: Black Sea University, Georgia Sports Academy, Tbilisi Institute of Asia & Africa
 Germany: Bremen University Landshut, FAU Erlangen-Nurnberg, HAW Landshut, Hochschule Bonn, Rhein-Sieg, Karlsruhe Institute of Technology, Mannheim University, PH Ludwigsburg, RWTH Aachen, Rheinische Friedrich-Wilhelms-Universitaet Bonn, Technical University of Darmstadt, Trier University, University of Cologne, University of Duisburg-Essen, University of Konstanz, University of Mainz, Technische Universität Braunschweig
 Greece: American College of Thessaloniki, Aristotle University of Thessaloniki, Deree American College of Greece, Ionian University, Technical University of Athens, University of Athens
 Hong Kong: The Hong Kong Institute of Education
 Hungary: Budapest Business School, Central European University, Dote University, Elte University, Eötvös University, Külker College, Technical University of Budapest, University of Foreign Trade
 Italy: Bocconi University, Polytechnic University of Marche
 Iraq: American University of Iraq
 Kazakhstan: KIMEP
 Kosovo: Alessandrio University, Genova University, Pristina University, University of Prishtina, Hasan Prishtina
 Kuwait: American University of Kuwait
 Jordan: Applied Science Private University, University of Jordan
 Lebanon: Antonine University, American University of Beirut, Beirut Arab University, Lebanese American University, Lebanese Youth Sport Union, Notre Dame University, St. Joseph University, The American University of Sat. Tech., University of Balamand, University Saint-Joseph, University Saint-Joseph de Beyrouth, West Mount University
 Lithuania: Kaunas University of Medicine
 Morocco: Al Akhawayn University
 Macedonia: State University of Tetova, Sts. Kiril & Methodus University, University of Goce Delcev
 Netherlands: Hogeschool Zeeland, Inhollan University, University of Amsterdam, University of Groningen, University of Technology Eindhoven, University of Twente, Wageningen University
 Nigeria: Delta State University, Kogi State University
 Omman: Sultan Qaboos University
 Pakistan: Lahore University of Management Sciences, Ned University of Eng. and Tech. Lums
 Poland: Cracow University of Economics, Maria Curie-Skladowska University, Universytet Gdanski
 Portugal: Instituto Superior Tecnico, Polytechnic University of Leiria
 Qatar: Qatar University
 Romania: Academia Nationela Educatie Sport, Anefs Bucharest University, Babes Bolyai University, Babes Cluj Napoca N.A. of Physical & Sport, Medicine University, National Academy of Physical Education & Sports, University of Agronomic Scienced and Veterinary, University of Bucharest, University of  Ptesti, University of Severin
 Russia: Asthrakan State University, Institute of International Relation, Mgimo University, Moscow State University, Russian State University, Russian State University of Humanities, Saint Petersburg State University, State University of Management, UFA State Technical Petroleum University, University of South Ural
 Serbia: Faculty of Architecture Belgrade, Faculty of Law, Faculty of Philology, Faculty of Philosophy, Faculty of Political Science, Faculty of Special Education and Rehabilitation, Faculty of Sports and Tourism, Faculty Sports and Physical Education, Faculty of Organizational Sciences, Philology University, Singidunum University, University of Belgrade Faculty of Law
 Sierra Leone: Njala University
 Slovakia: Economic University of Bratislava, University of Zilina
 Spain: University of Granada
 Switzerland: Necuchatel University, St. Gallen University, University of Berne, University of Fribourg, University of Zurich, Zurich University
 Turkey: Boğaziçi Graduates, Boğaziçi University, Fırat University, Galatasaray University, Hacettepe University, Haliç University, Istanbul Technical University, Istanbul University, Işık University, Kadir Has University, Koç University, Marmara University, Mersin University, Middle East Technical University, Mimar Sinan University, Okan University, Özyeğin University, Sabancı University, Trakya Medical University, Turkish Air Force, Turkish Naval Academy, Yeditepe University, Yıldız Technical University, Van University
 UAE: American University in Dubai, Bristol University
 UK: Oxford University, University of Westminster
 Ukraine: Volodymyr Dahl National University
 USA: Adelphi University, American University Select Team, Arkansas State University, Auburn University, Florida State University, Georgia Tech. University, Iowa State University, Kansas State University, Kennesaw State University, Midwest University, Sterling College, Union College, University of Augsburg, University of California, University of Central Florida, University of Florida, University of Kentucky, University of Maryland, University of Michigan

References

External links 
 Boğaziçi University (English)

Sports Fest
1980 establishments in Turkey
Sport in Turkey